Romulo Mercader Espaldon (September 16, 1925 – August 27, 2005) was a Filipino military officer, civil servant, and diplomat. He was the first naval officer to attain the rank of Rear Admiral in the Philippine Navy. He became overall military commander in Mindanao at the height of the Muslim secessionist movement led by the Moro National Liberation Front (MNLF) in the mid-1970s, during which he promoted a "Policy of Attraction" which won the respect of many Muslims and led 35,411 rebels to return to the fold of law by late 1978, and over 40,000 rebels by the early 1980s.

Early life and education 
Espaldon was the son of Christian Bicolano teachers Cipriano Espaldon and Claudia Mercader. Heeding the call of the government to serve in the remotest places in the Philippines in the early part of the 20th century, his family moved from Sorsogon to Tawi-Tawi where his parents were pioneer educators. His ability to speak Tausug and Sinama, and his understanding of Muslim custom would later prove indispensable during his military and civilian career. He would eventually embrace Islam.

He graduated as valedictorian from Bongao Elementary School in Tawi-Tawi in 1938, and with honors from Sulu High School in 1942.

After World War II, Espaldon was sent to the Cooks and Bakers School of the Philippine Army at Camp Olivas where he graduated First Honor. On March 23, 1946, as he and his classmates were about to board a Douglas C-47 plane to return to Mindanao after graduation, he received orders that he would be retained as instructor at the school for having topped his class; hence, he remained at Camp Olivas. That day, the plane that he was supposed to board crashed on Mount Banahaw, killing most of the military passengers on board.

After instructing at Camp Olivas, he attended FEATI University as a scholar and pursued a degree in aeronautical engineering.

In 1947, Espaldon was one of fifty Filipino scholars selected by nationwide competitive examinations for midshipman training at the United States Merchant Marine Academy (USMMA) at Kings Point, New York pursuant to the Philippine Rehabilitation Act of 1946. Among his classmates were notable political activists Nemesio Prudente and Navy Capt. Danilo Vizmanos. An honor student and cadet officer, he eventually graduated valedictorian of the USMMA Deck Class of 1950 with an average of 90%. In 1995, he made history in the Academy as being only the third alumnus inducted into its Hall of Distinguished Graduates for being the first Academy graduate to attain the rank of Rear Admiral and for his successful efforts in bringing peace to Southern Philippines.

In 1952, he took up the Anti-Submarine Warfare Deck Officers Course at the Naval Training College and finished first with a rating of 99%.

In 1968, he graduated from the Naval Command Course at the US Naval War College. A few years later, he obtained his masters degree in National Security Administration from the National Defense College of the Philippines where his academic performance was rated as "Superior." Out of thirteen foreign and local courses that he took, he topped six of them and the rest with honors.

In 1981, the Western Mindanao State University (WMSU) conferred upon him a Doctor of Humanities honoris causa for his role in elevating Zamboanga State College into WMSU.

Military career 
Espaldon's military career began at the age of 16 when he volunteered in the USAFFE as a member of the Bolo Batallion Unit in 1941 to fight the invading Japanese forces. During the Japanese occupation of the Philippines, he was a teenage guerrilla leader in Sulu and Tawi-Tawi. He also served as intelligence officer of the 1st Battalion, 1st Infantry Regiment and as liaison officer between the Sulu Area Command and American landing forces (Sulu White Task Force) in Tawi-Tawi during the liberation campaign. He was later assigned as Garrison Commander of the Cagayan de Sulu Forces. After World War II, he was commissioned as a second lieutenant in the Philippine Army.

Shortly after graduating from Kings Point in 1950, he was commissioned as an ensign in the Philippine Navy and became commanding officer of RPS Capiz and later RPS Iloilo. A decade later, he was appointed as naval attaché to Indonesia and Malaysia, and became fluent in Bahasa Indonesia.

After returning to the Philippines, he served as Chief of Naval Intelligence in 1966, as Acting Chief of the Intelligence Service of the AFP (ISAFP) in 1969, then as Vice Commander of the Philippine Navy in 1971.

In 1972, he would become Deputy Chief of Staff of the Armed Forces of the Philippines (AFP), only to be deprived of the top post because the Marcos administration reportedly preferred a super-loyalist like General Fabian Ver. Veteran Associated Press correspondent Gil Santos noted that Espaldon was one of the few "good guys" who wanted to restore professionalism in the military and got sidelined by Marcos and Ver.

That same year, the MNLF was founded by Nur Misuari as a splinter group of the Muslim Independence Movement. At its peak in 1974, it was able to field between 50,000 and 60,000 rebels, and as many as 20,000 were reportedly trained in Sabah with financial assistance from Libya.

From October 25, 1972, to August 31, 1973, Espaldon was designated as military supervisor of the Bureau of Customs due to the extortion syndicate and rampant smuggling that plagued the Bureau. He would later be conferred the Outstanding Achievement Medal for his wide-ranging reforms which led to a 24% increase in revenue collection from the previous year, reduction in processing time from the usual ten (10) days to seventy-two (72) hours through the implementation of a computer-based Entry Control System, the elimination of the "cabo" system at the North Harbor, and the investigation and prosecution of thirty-seven cases involving customs irregularities.

In 1973, Espaldon replaced his fellow Kings Point cadet Commodore Gil Fernandez as commanding officer of the AFP Southwest Command (SOWESCOM) reportedly to satisfy the terms of surrender of the MNLF Magic Eight rebel commanders. They had previously sought the relief of Fernandez who allegedly lacked sympathy for the Muslims. This signaled a desire for a changed approach in Mindanao from that of hard-lining Fernandez. With the assumption of Espaldon, his predecessor's Vietnam-style tactics of Body count and Search and destroy were abandoned in favor of his policy of attraction and peaceful reconciliation.

In addition to his military duties, he was appointed as the first governor of Tawi-Tawi when it became a province on September 11, 1973, and served until the first provincial elections were held pursuant to Presidential Decree No. 302. (Under the 1973 Constitution, only elective officials were prohibited from holding multiple government offices.) During the first 730 days of Tawi-Tawi as a province, Espaldon and Vice Governor Nur Jaafar spearheaded over 100 civilian infrastructure projects, including the construction of the provincial capitol, provincial hospital, public market, 50 mosques, school houses, radio station, airstrips, piers, houses, bridges, roads and water system.

The following year, he was designated as the second military governor of the newly-created province of Basilan, but administered the affairs of government through Colonel Florencio E. Magsino.

On December 29, 1973, Espaldon became the first naval officer to be donned the rank of rear admiral in the Philippine Navy. That same day, Commodore Hilario Ruiz, then Flag Officer-in-Command of the Philippine Navy, was likewise promoted to rear admiral.

On July 7, 1975, the Office of the Regional Commissioner for Region IX was created within the policy of rapprochement, in reversal of the iron-fist approach and Espaldon served as its first and only commissioner until it was abolished and replaced with the Lupong Tagapagpaganap Ng Pook (LTP) in 1979. He was succeeded by Ulbert Ulama "Bob" Tugung.

That same month, he led the signing and implementation of the Philippines-Indonesia Agreements on Border Crossing and Border Patrol which enhanced the maritime security cooperation between the two countries, for which he would later be awarded the Bintang Yudha Dharma Pratama, Indonesia's second highest military order of merit.

In 1976, SOWESCOM would become the AFP Southern Command (SOUTHCOM) with Espaldon as its first commander. As overall military commander in Mindanao, he was given full authority to command all forces in the south without the need to seek clearance from service chiefs to deploy troops. The doubling of Espaldon's authority reportedly resulted from the fact that his tactics had reduced the war in the SOWESCOM area, while the achievements of the AFP Central Mindanao Command (CEMCOM) under Gen. Fortunato Abat had been less notable.

That same year, he was appointed as member of the Agency for the Development and Welfare of Muslims in the Philippines which was chaired by Ambassador Lininding Pangandaman.

Following the execution of the Tripoli Agreement in Libya on December 23, 1976, a ceasefire agreement was signed in Zamboanga City on January 20, 1977, between Espaldon and Dr. Tham Manjoorsa, authorized representative of the MNLF. A subsequent plebiscite led to the creation of two autonomous regions, Regions IX and XII, in Mindanao.

By late 1978, Espaldon announced the collapse of the Northern Mindanao Revolutionary Command led by Abul Khayr Alonto and the surrender of 1,215 rebels, bringing the total to 35,411.

Throughout his stint as overall military commander in Mindanao, Espaldon's "Policy of Attraction" saw over 40,000 rebels lay down their arms, although some non-government and non-MNLF skeptics feel that these figures may have been overstated. Respected for both his competence and fairness, Espaldon had succeeded in persuading many MNLF personnel to accept amnesty and had reduced the level of fighting in the three Zamboanga provinces and in the Sulu archipelago.

Many rebels also underwent officer training for integration into the AFP as part of its effort to restore peace in Mindanao. Amilpasa "Caloy" Bandaying, who once belonged to the elite Top 90 of the MNLF before his surrender, was designated by Espaldon as his aide-de-camp despite being cautioned by his officers at SOUTHCOM. Bandaying, in his article "The Bangsamoro Story (The Real Story Behind The Struggle)," would later write:
Before his retirement on December 31, 1980, he was conferred the honorary title of Sultan Makasanyang (Sultan of Peace) by the Muslim communities of Autonomous Region IX. The Citation reads:

Civilian career 
In 1979, Espaldon was appointed as the first commissioner of the Commission on Islamic Affairs, which became the Ministry of Muslim Affairs in 1981. Under his leadership, the Philippine Shari'ah Institute was launched and spearheaded the translation of the Code of Muslim Personal Laws from English to Arabic, and the first Madrasa policy conference was held to discuss the integration of Madrasa-type education into the Philippine Educational System. He was also chairman of the Philippine Pilgrimage Authority and served as Amirul Hajj in 1981 and 1984.

He likewise became active in civic organizations such as the Boy Scouts of the Philippines where he served as Vice-President from 1981 to 1984, and Lions Clubs International where he served as District Governor from 1983 to 1984.

In 1990, he served as representative of the lone Legislative district of Tawi-Tawi during the 8th Congress of the Philippines after winning his election protest against Alawadin T. Bandon, Jr., making him the first elected representative of Tawi-Tawi.

In the diplomatic service, Espaldon was appointed as Philippine Ambassador to Egypt, Sudan and Somalia from 1984 to 1986, and to Saudi Arabia and Yemen from 1993 to 1998. He was also appointed Honorary Ambassador-at-large to Guam in 1990. During his stint as envoy to Saudi Arabia, he often reminded embassy personnel that one of their primary objectives was to serve and protect Overseas Filipino Workers.

His legacy and effectiveness as a peace negotiator was once again acknowledged when jihadist militant group Abu Sayyaf declared during the 2000 Sipadan Hostage Crisis that they would release three female hostages if the government agrees to have a new set of negotiators composed of Espaldon, Sen. Ramon Magsaysay Jr., and Sultan Rodinood Kiram. However, the request was turned down by the government. In 2003, he was advisor of a government panel that met with Prof. Shariff Julabbi, founder of the Moro Islamic Liberation Front splinter group Bangsamoro Mujahideen Alliance.

Notable career events

Creation of Tawi-Tawi Province 
Espaldon lamented the fact that government services would mostly reach Jolo but barely reach Tawi-Tawi when it was still part of the Province of Sulu, which worsened poverty and insurgency in the area. According to Espaldon, President Marcos asked him, "Why are the young boys of Tawi-Tawi easily wooed by the Moro National Liberation Front?" Espaldon replied, "The Sama boys, like their elders and leaders, are tired and weary of their union with the Province of Sulu. They want to have their own leaders and manage their own affairs. If His Excellency wants to solve the problem, I recommend that he create them into a separate province and allow them to exercise their own local prerogatives." Soon after, Presidential Decree No. 302 was signed creating the province of Tawi-Tawi. Hence, Espaldon earned the moniker "Father of Tawi-Tawi."

Surrender of the MNLF Magic Eight 
In October 1973, then Commodore Espaldon received information that the so-called Magic Eight rebel commanders of the MNLF, composed of Abbas "Maas Bawang" Estino, Gerry Matba, Bagis Hassan, Ahmad Omar, Jairulla Abdurajak, Alih Abubakar and Tupay Loong, wanted to surrender to him, along with their 2,000 fighters. It was agreed that the rebels would be brought down from the hills to the shore of Panamao beach in Jolo, while Espaldon would anchor his ship about 500 yards from the shore and wait for the eight commanders to board the ship where the surrender ceremonies would take place. By noon time, none of the eight commanders had arrived at the ship. It was already afternoon when Kumander Maas Bawang arrived in a small pump boat. He requested to speak with Espaldon, and in the Tausug dialect, relayed the rebels' request for Espaldon to come ashore and personally accept their surrender. Despite the last-minute change in plan, Espaldon agreed. With a small pump boat and eight of his men, all unarmed, Espaldon arrived at the beach. The rebels rushed to Espaldon and his men and started embracing them, crying, and saying that the government is sincere.

Highjacking of MV Don Carlos
On April 30, 1978, MV Don Carlos of Sulpicio Lines was hijacked and its 56 hostages held captive by terrorists who demanded 700,000 pesos (nearly 20 million pesos in 2020) for their release. Later, the ransom demand was dropped in exchange for the release of some rebel prisoners, but the military also rejected this. "We are ready to assist the Basilan terrorists provided they release the hostages without ransom," Espaldon said. After 23 days of fighting with their captors on Basilan island, government forces finally obtained the release of all hostages.

According to Sulpicio Lines vice-president BGen Emilio Alcoseba (ret.), the company did not pay a single centavo of ransom for the release of the 56 crew and passengers. "Without the assistance of Admiral Espaldon and General Luga, the terrorists would not have been pressured into releasing the hostages," he said.

Highjacking of Suehiro Maru 
On September 26, 1975, Japanese freighter Suehiro Maru was hijacked in Zamboanga and its 29 crew members held hostage by some 40 terrorists who demanded $133,000 (nearly $700,000 in 2020) for their release. After considerable pressure from Espaldon who formed a blockade with a fleet of 11 Navy ships, the rebels progressively softened their demands and eventually offered to release the ship and the crew in return for safe passage without a single cent being paid as ransom.

Kidnapping of Eunice Diment 
On February 28, 1976, British missionary-translator Eunice Diment, who was working among the Sama Banguingui, was kidnapped from a boat off Basilan Island by official action of the Basilan Revolutionary Committee of the MNLF's regional command in Basilan. She was released unharmed on March 17 with no ransom being paid. The Hong Kong-based Far Eastern Economic Review noted that reactions to her kidnapping were "a good example of how Espaldon and his officers work."

Kidnapping of Pierre Huguet 
On February 26, 1978, Pierre Huguet, a senior official in the French Ministry of Cultural Affairs, was abducted while holidaying in Zamboanga City. Huguet was taking photos of houses on stilts in Zamboanga Bay when he was pushed into the water by three rebels, pulled into a boat, and was held captive for $132,000 in ransom (over $500,000 in 2020) on Basilan island. A note saying "Please send the money immediately," believed to have been dictated to Huguet by the kidnappers, was transmitted to his wife in Manila. Espaldon coordinated with French Ambassador Raphaël-Léonard Touze regarding courses of action and eventually secured the peaceful release of Huguet without paying ransom, pursuant to government policy. However, the government reportedly paid for the "expenses" incurred by the guerrillas in keeping Huguet for two weeks as a concession. Espaldon would later be conferred the Légion d'honneur, the highest French order of merit.

Battle of Jolo 
On February 7, 1974, government forces began a military offensive against MNLF forces that managed to take control of the municipality of Jolo, Sulu, resulting in a large number of civilian and military casualties and substantial damage to the municipality. Considering Espaldon's preferred "Policy of Attraction" which saw a period of rebel returnees reintegrating into the mainstream, he reportedly opposed military operation in Jolo but was apparently overruled by the central government. He would later be remembered for sending naval ships to the Jolo Pier and being the "prime mover" of stranded Joloanos to safety.

In the aftermath, he was made part of the Executive Committee of the Inter-Agency Task Force for the Rehabilitation of Jolo.

Six years after the Battle of Jolo, the Municipality of Jolo presented a Citation to Espaldon which reads:

In the media 

Espaldon appeared twice on the cover of Asiaweek.

He also appeared in the March 1977 issue of National Geographic. In his article, Don Moser wrote:In January 1984, he was featured on the cover of Mr. & Ms., a weekly opposition tabloid magazine created in response to the Assassination of Benigno Aquino Jr., and named as one of the 50 Most Capable To Lead.

Notable awards

Philippine Awards 

 Presidential Merit Award
 Outstanding Achievement Medals
 Distinguished Service Stars
 Military Merit Medals
 Presidential Unit Citations
 Long Service Medals
 Philippine Liberation Medal
 Jolo Campaign Medal
 Anti-Dissidence Campaign Medal
 Doctor of Humanities honoris causa, Western Mindanao State University (1980)
Distinguished Achievement Award, National Defense College of the Philippines (1988)
Aurora Aragon Quezon Award (1979)
Gintong Ama Award for Government and Public Service (1988)

Foreign Awards 

US Congressional Gold Medal for Filipino Veterans of World War II (posthumous; 2022)
 Légion d'honneur (1978)
 Bintang Yudha Dharma Pratama (1978)
 World War II Victory Medals
 Asiatic–Pacific Campaign Medals
 American Campaign Medal
USMMA Hall of Distinguished Graduates (1995)
USMMA Distinguished Service Award

Personal life 
Espaldon was married to Eleanor Asistores whom he met on Polillo Island while his ship was assigned to patrol the eastern coast of Luzon. They raised seven children.

Death 

Espaldon passed away due to colon cancer in 2005 at the age of 79 and was given full military honors during his interment at the Libingan ng mga Bayani.

Memorial 

In 2009, the Philippine Navy issued HPN General Order No. 229 renaming Naval Station Zamboanga, the headquarters of Naval Forces Western Mindanao, as Naval Station Romulo Espaldon in his honor.

References 

1925 births
2005 deaths
Filipino Muslims
Philippine Navy personnel
Governors of Tawi-Tawi
Governors of Basilan
Members of the House of Representatives of the Philippines from Tawi-Tawi
United States Merchant Marine Academy alumni